The 64th Troop Command is a Troop command of the Wisconsin Army National Guard. It is one of the four major units of the Wisconsin Army National Guard. The 64th Troop Command provides administrative, training and logistical support to unique, specialized or smaller Wisconsin Army National Guard units that are not part of other major deployable units. With an authorized strength of more than 1,700 Soldiers, the command includes aviation, sustainment and support, personnel, military police, band, transportation, maintenance, public affairs, rear area operations command, and medical units.

Structure
64th Troop Command
 Headquarters and Headquarters Detachment - Madison
 54th Civil Support Team (CST) 

732nd Combat Sustainment Support Battalion
 Headquarters and Headquarters Detachment - Tomah
 107th Maintenance Company  - Sparta
 Detachment 1, 107th Maintenance Company - Viroqua
 1157th Transportation Company - Oshkosh
 1158th Transportation Company - Beloit
 Detachment 1, 1158th Transportation Company - Black River Falls

641st Troop Command Battalion
 Headquarters and Headquarters Detachment - Madison
 Wisconsin Medical Detachment - Camp Douglas
 112th Mobile Public Affairs Detachment - Madison
 132nd Army Band - Madison
 135th Medical Company - Waukesha
 273rd Engineer Company (SAPPER) - Medford
 457th Chemical Company - Hartford
 1967th Contingency Contracting Team - Camp Douglas

1st Battalion, 147th Aviation Regiment
 Headquarters and Headquarters Company - Madison
 Company A - Madison
 Detachment 1, Company C - Madison
 Company D - Madison
 Company E - Madison
West Bend Aviation
 Detachment 1, Company B, 248th Aviation Support Bn. - West Bend

References

Wisconsin National Guard units
Military units and formations in Wisconsin